Wolves of the City is a 1929 American crime film directed by Leigh Jason and written by Carl Krusada and Vin Moore. The film stars Bill Cody, Sally Blane, Al Ferguson, Monte Montague, Louise Carver and Charles Clary. The film was released on February 24, 1929, by Universal Pictures.

Cast        
Bill Cody as Jack Flynn
Sally Blane as Helen Marsh
Al Ferguson as Mike
Monte Montague as Roscoe Jones 
Louise Carver as Mother Machin
Charles Clary as Frank Marsh

References

External links
 

1929 films
American crime films
1929 crime films
Universal Pictures films
Films directed by Leigh Jason
American silent feature films
American black-and-white films
1920s English-language films
1920s American films